Little Hastings Tract is a mostly submerged island in the Sacramento–San Joaquin River Delta. It is in Solano County, California. It appears, above water, on a 1978 USGS map.

References

Islands of Solano County, California
Islands of the Sacramento–San Joaquin River Delta
Islands of Northern California